Darcy Tabitha Bourne (born 13 October 2001) is an English field hockey player who plays as a forward for Surbiton and the England and Great Britain national teams.

She was educated at Wellington College, Berkshire.

Club career

Bourne plays club hockey in the Women's England Hockey League Premier Division for Surbiton.

She re-joined them after playing in the US for Duke Blue Devils for the 2020–21 season.

References

External links
 
 

2001 births
Living people
English female field hockey players
Women's England Hockey League players